Hellen Ng'andwe Chanda (born 19 June 1998) is a Zambian footballer who plays as a forward for Green Buffaloes FC and the Zambia women's national team. She competed at the 2018 Africa Women Cup of Nations, playing in one match.

References

1998 births
Living people
Zambian women's footballers
Zambia women's international footballers
Women's association football forwards
Footballers at the 2020 Summer Olympics
Olympic footballers of Zambia